Youssef Zouaoui (born 11 September 1946) is a Tunisian footballer. Since 1983, he has played for major clubs and national teams. He was also a big player in the CA Bizerte (CAB), and remains the second leading scorer in the club's history.

Early attracted by football, he followed his elder brother Larbi Zouaoui by signing with CAB. His qualities of striker and scorer he can be part of the team of juniors and seniors to join the cabinet in 1963, continuing his career until 1977. He knows, however, no international career and played only during a few meetings with Tunisia national football team, due to the presence of major players such as Tahar Chaïbi, Ezzedine Chakroun or Mohamed Ali Akid.

His playing career ended, he chose that of coach. From his second season as head of the CAB team, he created a stir by winning the Tunisia championship football. It is then called upon the national team and, despite the veto cons of corporate players like Tarak Dhiab or Hedi Bayari, it gives excellent results. Dismissed in 1986, he joined the Federation of UAE football as national coach. Revenue Tunisia expand its ranking by national and continental titles, he resumed his place in the national team in 1993, with less success, as shown with the disastrous start of the team at the 1994 African Cup of Nations, which earned him a second dismissal.

Called to lead the Espérance Sportive de Tunis where Slim Chiboub it provides all conditions for success, winning numerous national titles but failed in the CAF Champions League. He leads the national team for the third time in 2002 instead of Ammar Souyah and Khemais Labidi, as technical director.

He has also been technical director of Tunisia.

Records

Player stats
 Tunisian Ligue Professionnelle 1: 235 matches and 63 goals;
 Tunisian President Cup: 28 games and 18 goals.

National teams managing record

Honours

CA Bizertin

 Tunisian Championship (1): 1983–84
 Tunisian President Cup (1): 1987

Club Africain

 Afro-Asian Club Championship (1): 1993

Espérance Tunis

 Tunisian Championship (4): 1997–98, 1998–99, 1999–00, 2000–01
 Tunisian President Cup (1): 1999
 CAF Cup (1): 1997
 African Cup Winners' Cup (1): 1998

Stade Tunisien

 Arab Cup Winners' Cup (1): 2002

References

1946 births
Living people
Tunisian footballers
CA Bizertin players
Tunisian Ligue Professionnelle 1 players
Association football forwards
Tunisian football managers
Club Athlétique Bizertin managers
Tunisia national football team managers
1994 African Cup of Nations managers
United Arab Emirates national football team managers
Club Africain football managers
Espérance Sportive de Tunis managers
Stade Tunisien managers
Al-Qadisiyah FC managers
Ettifaq FC managers
Tunisian Ligue Professionnelle 1 managers
Tunisian expatriate football managers
Expatriate football managers in the United Arab Emirates
Tunisian expatriate sportspeople in the United Arab Emirates
Expatriate football managers in Saudi Arabia
Tunisian expatriate sportspeople in Saudi Arabia